William Santino Dralu (born 5 June 1947) is a Ugandan sprinter. He competed in the men's 100 metres at the 1972 Summer Olympics. He won a bronze medal at the 1974 British Commonwealth Games in the 4 x 400 metres relay.

References

1947 births
Living people
Athletes (track and field) at the 1968 Summer Olympics
Athletes (track and field) at the 1972 Summer Olympics
Ugandan male sprinters
Olympic athletes of Uganda
Athletes (track and field) at the 1970 British Commonwealth Games
Athletes (track and field) at the 1974 British Commonwealth Games
Commonwealth Games bronze medallists for Uganda
Commonwealth Games medallists in athletics
Place of birth missing (living people)
20th-century Ugandan people
21st-century Ugandan people
Medallists at the 1974 British Commonwealth Games